Bob O'Shea (born 3 July 1960) is a British former wheelchair rugby captain of the Great Britain national wheelchair rugby team.

He was the captain of the team that came in 6th place at the 2000 Summer Paralympics. He was also on the team for the 4th place at the 2004 Summer Paralympics.

In 1998, on his 28th birthday, he broke his neck while diving into a pool.

References

1960 births
Living people
Paralympic wheelchair rugby players of Great Britain
Wheelchair rugby players at the 2000 Summer Paralympics
Wheelchair rugby players at the 2004 Summer Paralympics